Phestilla panamica is a species of sea slug, an aeolid nudibranch, a marine gastropod mollusk in the family Trinchesiidae. The species feeds on the hard coral genus Porites.

Distribution
This species was described from Saboga Island, Pearl Island Group, Panama, .

References 

Trinchesiidae
Gastropods described in 1982